The Cowboy and the Outlaw is a 1929 American silent Western film directed by J. P. McGowan and starring Bob Steele, Edna Aslin and Bud Osborne. It was produced as an independent second feature on Poverty Row. It was originally shot as a silent film, but later had sound effects added.

Synopsis
A ranch owner is killed on his way to the bank and a manhunt is launched for the culprit.

Cast
 Bob Steele as George Hardcastle
 Edna Aslin as Bertha Bullhead
 Bud Osborne as Lefty Lawson
 Thomas G. Lingham as Tom Bullhead
 Cliff Lyons as Slim Saxon
 J. P. McGowan as Pepper Hardcastle
 Alfred Hewston as Walter Driver

References

Bibliography
 Pitts, Michael R. Poverty Row Studios, 1929–1940. McFarland & Company, 2005.

External links
 

1929 films
1929 Western (genre) films
American Western (genre) films
American black-and-white films
1920s English-language films
Films directed by J. P. McGowan
Transitional sound Western (genre) films
1920s American films